In set theory, a paradoxical set is a set that has a paradoxical decomposition. A paradoxical decomposition of a set is two families of disjoint subsets, along with appropriate group actions that act on some universe (of which the set in question is a subset), such that each partition can be mapped back onto the entire set using only finitely many distinct functions (or compositions thereof) to accomplish the mapping.

Paradoxical sets exist as a consequence of the Axiom of Infinity. Admitting infinite classes as sets is sufficient to allow paradoxical sets.

Definition
Suppose a group  acts on a set . Then  is -paradoxical if there exists some disjoint subsets  and some group elements  such that:

 and

Examples

Free group 

This is a paradoxical decomposition because

Banach–Tarski paradox 

The most famous example of paradoxical sets is the Banach–Tarski paradox, which divides the sphere into paradoxical sets for the special orthogonal group. This result depends on the axiom of choice.

See also 

 Pathological (mathematics)

References 

Set theory
Geometric dissection